Il prato (internationally released as The Meadow) is a 1979 Italian drama film directed by Paolo and Vittorio Taviani.  It was screened at the Venice Film Festival. For this film Isabella Rossellini was awarded with a Silver Ribbon for Best New Actress.

Plot

Cast 
Michele Placido as Enzo
Saverio Marconi as Giovanni
Isabella Rossellini as Eugenia
Giulio Brogi as  Sergio 
Angela Goodwin as  Giovanni's Mother

See also      
 List of Italian films of 1979

References

External links

1979 films
Italian drama films
1979 drama films
Films scored by Ennio Morricone
Films directed by Paolo and Vittorio Taviani
1970s Italian films